Guy Louis Busson du Maurier DSO (18 May 1865, London, England – 9 March 1915, Kemmel, Flanders, Belgium) was an English army officer and playwright. He was the son of the writer George du Maurier and brother of Sylvia Llewelyn Davies and the actor Gerald du Maurier.

Busson du Maurier was educated at Marlborough and the Royal Military College, Sandhurst, and was commissioned a lieutenant in the Royal Fusiliers on 7 February 1885. He was promoted to captain on 15 September 1896, and served in the Second Boer War, where he commanded a mounted infantry regiment, earning a promotion to major on 12 December 1900. For his service in the war, he received the Distinguished Service Order (DSO) in the October 1902 South African honours list.

He achieved notoriety in 1909 as the initially anonymous author of the play An Englishman's Home. The play tells the story of the Brown family caught up in the invasion of Britain by a foreign power identified as "Nearland"  but widely assumed to represent Germany. When the play was staged in Germany, it caused an outrage, as the German press saw clear references to their homeland. In 1940 it was made into a propaganda film, more pointedly titled "Mad Men of Europe".

At the death of his sister Sylvia, and as requested in her will, he became co-guardian to the Llewelyn Davies boys who inspired Peter Pan. He served for the last time in World War I, being killed in action in Flanders in 1915. J. M. Barrie wrote to Guy's nephew George Llewelyn Davies to inform him of the death; by the time Barrie received his response, George himself had been killed.

Notes

References

External links

English dramatists and playwrights
Royal Fusiliers officers
Graduates of the Royal Military College, Sandhurst
1915 deaths
1865 births
Military personnel from London
British military personnel killed in World War I
English male dramatists and playwrights
Guy
British Army personnel of the Second Boer War
Companions of the Distinguished Service Order
British Army personnel of World War I